The Sherard Baronetcy, of Lopthorp in the County of Lincoln, was a title in the Baronetage of England.

History
It was created on 25 May 1674 for John Sherard, with remainder to his brothers and the male issue of their bodies. He died unmarried and was succeeded according to the special remainder by his younger brother, the second Baronet. The latter was also unmarried and was succeeded by another brother, the third Baronet. The title became extinct on the death of the third Baronet's son, the fourth Baronet, in 1748.

Sherard baronets, of Lopthorp (1674)
Sir John Sherard, 1st Baronet (–1725)
Sir Richard Sherard, 2nd Baronet (–1730)
Sir Brownlow Sherard, 3rd Baronet (1668–1736)
Sir Brownlow Sherard, 4th Baronet (c. 1702–1748)

See also
Baron Sherard
Earl of Harborough

References

Extinct baronetcies in the Baronetage of England
Baronetcies created with special remainders
1674 establishments in England
1748 disestablishments
Sherard family